Nicole Monique Ng (born 26 August) is an Australian diver.

Nicole was selected to represent Australia at the 2004 World Cup, Athens. She was a 10-meter platform diver. At the 2004 Australian Olympic trials, Ng placed third to Loudy Wiggins and Chantelle Newbery.

Nicole earned her first international medal at the 2005 China international, Chenzhou. She represented Australia for eight years and was selected to compete at multiple FINA Diving Grand Prix competitions. Ng held a scholarship at the Australian institute of Sports and completed a Bachelor Science at Griffith University whilst training.

Nicole is a Medical Science Liaison, Neuroscience within the medical industry.

References

Living people
Australian female divers
20th-century Australian women
21st-century Australian women
Year of birth missing (living people)